Mario Rosa (8 May 1932 – 24 December 2022) was an Italian historian.

Life and career 
Rosa was born on 8 May 1932. He studied at the Scuola Normale Superiore in Pisa. Rosa had taught early modern history at the Universities of Lecce, Bari, Pisa, La Sapienza of Rome and finally at the Scuola Normale Superiore di Pisa, where he served also as deputy-director and where he was actually emeritus.

Rosa also taught as professeur invité at the École des Hautes Études en Sciences Sociales in Paris. He was of the Accademia nazionale dei Lincei. His research concerned the religious history of the 18th century, the ecclesiastical, cultural and religious history between 16th and 17th centuries, the history of science, academia and libraries.

Rosa died on 24 December 2022, at the age of 90.

Bibliography (selected)
Riformatori e ribelli nel ‘700 religioso italiano (Dedalo 1969)
Politica e religione nel ‘700 europeo (Sansoni 1974)
Religione e società nel Mezzogiorno tra Cinque e Seicento (De Donato 1976)
(a cura di) Cattolicesimo e lumi nel Settecento italiano (Herder 1981)
La Chiesa e gli Stati italiani nell’età dell’assolutismo, in Letteratura Italiana, I (Einaudi 1982)
La Chiesa meridionale nell’età della Controriforma, in Storia d’Italia, Annali, 9 (Einaudi 1986)
La religiosa, in L’uomo barocco, a cura di R. Villari (Laterza 1991)
Settecento religioso. Politica della Ragione e religione del cuore (Marsilio 1999)
Clero cattolico e società europea nell'età moderna (Laterza 2006)
 La contrastata ragione. Riforme e religione nell'Italia del Settecento (Edizioni di Storia e Letteratura, 2009)
 La curia romana nell'età moderna. Istituzioni, cultura, carriere (Viella, 2013)
 Il giansenismo nell'Italia del Settecento. Dalla riforma della Chiesa alla democrazia rivoluzionaria (Carocci, 2014)

References

External links
 Mario Rosa webpage on the site of the Scuola Normale Superiore

1932 births
2022 deaths
20th-century Italian historians
21st-century Italian historians
Italian historians of religion
Historians of science
Members of the Lincean Academy
Scuola Normale Superiore di Pisa alumni
Academic staff of the Scuola Normale Superiore di Pisa
Academic staff of the University of Pisa
Academic staff of the Sapienza University of Rome
Academic staff of the University of Bari